Shell plc is the world's second largest public petroleum company and since 20 July 2005 its senior official has been its chairman. Until their amalgamation in 2005, the Royal Dutch Petroleum Company and the Shell Transport and Trading Company had separate leaders. From 1946 to 2005, an additional office was created to oversee their group of companies. The following is a list of senior officials of the Royal Dutch Petroleum Company, Shell Transport and Trading Company, Royal Dutch/Shell Group, and Shell plc.

Royal Dutch Petroleum (1890–2005) 
Although a committee of managing directors had existed since the company's inception in 1890, the office of General Managing Director was not created until 17 December 1902. On 21 October 1956 the title changed to President-Director. The office was abolished on 20 July 2005 when Royal Dutch Petroleum and Shell Transport amalgamated.
 Henri Detarding, 1902–1936
 Frits de Kok, 1937–1940
 vacant, 28 October 1940 – 2 January 1947
 Guus Kessler, 1947–1948
 Barthold Theodoor Willem van Hasselt, 1949–1951
 John Hugo Loudon, 1952–1965
 Jan Brouwer, 1965–1970
 Gerrit Wagner, 1971–1977
 Dirk de Bruyne, 1977–1982
 Lodewijk Christiaan van Wachem, 1982–1992
 Cor Herkströter, 1992–1998
 Maarten van den Bergh, 1998–2000
 Jeroen van der Veer, 2000–2005

Shell Transport and Trading (1897–2005)
The senior official of Shell Transport and Trading was its chairman, created 18 October 1897. The office was abolished on 20 July 2005 when Royal Dutch Petroleum and Shell Transport amalgamated.
 Marcus Samuel, 1897–1921
 Walter Samuel, 1921–1946
 Frederick Godber, 1946–1961
 Frederick Stephens, 1961–1967
 Sir David Barran, 1967–1972
 Francis McFadzean, 1972–1976
 Carmichael Pocock, 1976–1979
 Sir Peter Baxendell, 1979–1985
 Sir Peter Holmes, 1985–1993
 Sir John Jennings, 1993–1997
 Sir Mark Moody-Stuart, 1997–2001
 Sir Philip Watts, 2001–2004
 Sir Ronald Oxburgh, 2004–2005

Royal Dutch/Shell Group (1907–2005)
Following the union of Royal Dutch and Shell in 1907, both companies retained their own senior officials. In 1946, the Committee of Managing Directors was established to oversee the group of companies, and was led by a chairman. The Chairman of the Committee was either the Managing Director/President-Director of Royal Dutch, or the Chairman of Shell. In October 2004 the Committee of Managing Directors was renamed the Executive Committee. The office was abolished on 20 July 2005 when Royal Dutch Petroleum and Shell Transport amalgamated.

 Guus Kessler, 1946–1948
 Barthold Theodoor Willem van Hasselt, 1949–1951
 John Hugo Loudon, 1952–1965
 Jan Brouwer, 1965–1970
 Sir David Barran, 1970–1972
 Gerrit Wagner, 1972–1977
 Carmichael Pocock, 1977–1979
 Dirk de Bruyne, 1979–1982
 Sir Peter Baxendell, 1982–1985
 Lodewijk Christiaan van Wachem, 1985–1992
 Sir Peter Holmes, 1992–1993
 Cor Herkströter, 1993–1998
 Sir Mark Moody-Stuart, 1998–2001
 Sir Philip Watts, 2001–2004
 Jeroen van der Veer, 2004–2005

Royal Dutch Shell plc (2005–2022) and Shell plc (2022–) 
When Royal Dutch and Shell consolidated into a single company on 20 July 2005, the company's senior official became the Chairman of the Board of Directors.

 Aad Jacobs, 2005–2006
 Jorma Ollila, 2006–2015
 Charles Holliday, 2015–2021
 Andrew Mackenzie, 2021–

References

Directors of Shell plc
Shell
Shell plc